Anson Waterman Pope (June 30, 1812 – October 5, 1871) was an American who served three discontinuous one-year terms as a member of the Wisconsin State Assembly, in 1849 as a Whig, and in 1861 and 1866 as a Republican, while living in Janesville, Wisconsin. He spent his last few years as an orchardist in Cedar County, Missouri.

His daughter Ada was married at one time to the conman James Addison Reavis, the self-styled "Baron of Arizona".

References

1812 births
1871 deaths
People from Cedar County, Missouri
Politicians from Janesville, Wisconsin
Wisconsin Whigs
19th-century American politicians
Republican Party members of the Wisconsin State Assembly